KVFA-LP was the callsign of a low power television station broadcasting in Yuma, Arizona in analog on channel 6. The station was owned by KM Communications of Skokie, Illinois. It was an automated English language independent station.

History
On October 7, 2004, the Federal Communications Commission (FCC) granted a permit to KM Communications to construct a low-power television station on VHF channel 6 to serve Yuma, Arizona. The station was originally assigned callsign K06OD, but in November 2005, took the call letters KVFA-LP. The station was finally licensed on November 6, 2007 by the FCC. KVFA went off the air on April 30, 2012 due to financial issues that resulted in the station losing its transmitter site; it never returned to the air, and the license was canceled on June 19, 2013.

References

Defunct television stations in the United States
Television channels and stations established in 2007
Television channels and stations disestablished in 2012
VFA-LP
2007 establishments in Arizona
2012 disestablishments in Arizona
VFA-LP